The Nasserist Unionist People's Organisation (Al-Tantheem Al-Wahdawi Al-Sha'abi Al-Nasseri) is a Nasserist political party in Yemen.

The party was founded in Taiz on December 25, 1965. The party was legalized in 1989.

In 1993 the party held its 8th conference. The conference elected an 89-member politburo. Abdul-Malik al-Mikhlafi was elected the new general secretary of the party, replacing Abdul Ghani Thabet. Thabet was general secretary of the party 1990–1993.

At the last legislative elections in 2003 the party won 1.85% of the popular vote and 3 out of 301 seats.

The party publishes al-Wahdawi.

In 2011, the party has participated in the Yemeni uprising against President Ali Abdullah Saleh.

Electoral history

House of Representatives elections

See also 

Joint Meeting Parties

References

External links
www.alwahdawi.net 

1965 establishments in Yemen
Arab nationalism in Yemen
Nasserist political parties
Organizations of the Arab Spring
Organizations of the Yemeni Crisis (2011–present)
Political parties established in 1965
Political parties in Yemen
Socialist parties in Yemen
Yemeni Revolution
Formerly banned socialist parties